Cheltenham Wildlife Management Area is a Wildlife Management Area in Prince George's County, Maryland. The  reserve is primarily used for recreation and for dove hunting. The area includes a public archery range.

References

External links
 Cheltenham Wildlife Management Area

Wildlife management areas of Maryland
Protected areas of Prince George's County, Maryland